Fiji competed at the 2016 Summer Olympics in Rio de Janeiro, Brazil, from 5 to 21 August 2016. Since the nation's debut in 1956, Fijian athletes had taken part in every edition of the Summer Olympic Games, except for two occasions. Fiji failed to register any athletes at the 1964 Summer Olympics in Tokyo, and joined the American-led boycott when Moscow hosted the 1980 Summer Olympics.

Fiji Association of Sports and National Olympic Committee sent the nation's largest delegation to the Games, due to the attendance of the men's football and rugby sevens teams. A total of 54 athletes, 37 men and 17 women, and 35 officials were registered to the Fijian squad across ten different sports. There was only a single competitor in archery, boxing, judo, shooting, and table tennis, the country's sporting debut apart from the rugby sevens.

The Fijian team featured a number of returning Olympians, including archer Rob Elder, javelin thrower Leslie Copeland, swimmer Matelita Buadromo (women's 200 m freestyle), weightlifter Manueli Tulo (men's 56 kg), and judoka Josateki Naulu (men's 81 kg). 53-year-old trap shooter Glenn Kable, who had competed in every edition since 2004, was the oldest and most experienced member of the team, with 17-year-old table tennis player Sally Yee rounding out the field as the youngest member. Rugby sevens team captain Osea Kolinisau was selected as Fiji's flag bearer for the opening ceremony.

Fiji earned its first ever Olympic medal at these Games, with a gold from the men's rugby sevens team (led by Kolinisau).

Medalists

Archery

One Fijian archer qualified for the men's individual recurve at the Olympics with a top two finish at the Oceania Qualification Tournament in Nuku'alofa.

Three-time Olympian Rob Elder scored a personal best of 635 during the qualification round to obtain a fifty-sixth position, before he was beaten three straight set by world no. 9 archer Wei Chun-heng of Chinese Taipei in his opening match.

Athletics

Fiji received two universality places from IAAF to compete in the Olympics. These places were awarded to London 2012 javelin thrower and 2015 Pacific Games gold medalist Leslie Copeland, and sprinter Sisilia Seavula in the women's 100 metres.

Seavula was among the fastest sprinters to progress beyond the prelims, but she finished eighth in the heats, resulting to her elimination. Meanwhile, Copeland threw a best of 76.04 m to obtain the thirty-second position in the qualifying round of the men's javelin throw, unable to improve upon his thirteenth-place feat four years earlier in London.

Track & road events

Field events

Boxing

Fiji received an invitation from the Tripartite Commission to send a male boxer competing in the welterweight division to the Games, signifying the nation's return to the sport for the first time since 1988. 2015 Pacific Games silver medalist Winston Hill lost his opening round bout to Armenia's Vladimir Margaryan through a unanimous decision, with the judges scored 3–0, in favor of the latter boxer.

Football

Men's tournament

Fiji men's football team qualified for the Olympics by winning the Olympic qualifying final at the 2015 Pacific Games Football Tournament in Papua New Guinea.

Team roster

Group play

Judo

Fiji qualified one judoka for the men's light-middleweight category (81 kg) at the Games. London 2012 Olympian Josateki Naulu earned a continental quota spot from the Oceania region as the highest-ranked Fijian judoka outside of direct qualifying position in the IJF World Ranking List of 30 May 2016. Naulu received a bye in the opening round, before facing Uzbekistan's Shakhzodbek Sabirov for his first match of the meet. He seized an early lead by scoring a yuko, until Sabirov clutched him on the tatami with a soto makikomi (outer wraparound) to score an ippon for a victory at one minute and thirty-one seconds, resulting to Naulu's defeat.

Rugby sevens

Men's tournament

The Fijian men's rugby sevens team qualified for the Olympics by having achieved one of the top four places at the 2014–15 Sevens World Series.

Team roster

Group play

Quarterfinal

Semifinal

Gold medal match

Women's tournament

The Fijian women's rugby sevens team qualified for the Olympics by winning the 2015 FORU Women's Sevens Championships.

Team roster

Group play

Quarterfinal

Classification semifinal (5–8)

Seventh place match

Shooting

Fiji qualified one shooter in the men's trap by securing one of the available Olympic berths at the 2015 Oceania Continental Championships in Sydney, Australia.

Swimming

Fiji received a Universality invitation from FINA to send two swimmers (one male and one female) to the Olympics.

Table tennis

Fiji entered one athlete into the table tennis competition at the Games for the first time in the nation's Olympic history. Sally Yee secured a spot in the women's singles by virtue of her top three finish at the 2016 Oceania Qualification Tournament in Bendigo, Australia.

Weightlifting

Fiji qualified one male and one female weightlifter for the Rio Olympics by virtue of a top five national finish (for men) and top four (for women), respectively, at the 2016 Oceania Championships. The team must allocate these places to individual athletes by 20 June 2016.

References

External links 
 

Olympics
2016
Nations at the 2016 Summer Olympics